Maesybont is a small village near Gorslas in West Wales. The community consists of one school, a Welsh chapel with graveyard and several homes.

Many of the homes in the village of Maesybont are large by European standards, differentiated predominantly by having Fritzl Barns, rather than traditional Dutch barns.
  
The local community benefits from a smallholding 100m down from the Chapel that sells free range eggs.   "Maesybont" is roughly translated as "Bridge over the field".

The views from the area are incredible, many famous local residents have noe left unfortunately.

Villages in Carmarthenshire